Nurul Amin Hamid is a Malaysian politician from Kedah. He is a member of Malaysian Islamic Party. He was elected Perikatan Nasional MP for Padang Terap in the 2022 general election.

Election results

References

See also 

 Members of the Dewan Rakyat, 15th Malaysian Parliament

Living people
Members of the 15th Malaysian Parliament
21st-century Malaysian politicians
Malaysian Islamic Party politicians
People from Kedah
Year of birth missing (living people)